West Branch Louse Creek is a  long second-order tributary to Louse Creek in Holt County, Nebraska. The confluence of this creek with East Branch Louse Creek forms Louse Creek.

Watershed

See also

List of rivers of Nebraska

References

Rivers of Holt County, Nebraska
Rivers of Nebraska